W251AO, WOXL-HD2, 98.1 the River is a Triple-A low-power radio station in Asheville, North Carolina. It is operated by Asheville Radio Group, a subsidiary of Saga Communications, owner of WOXL-FM, WISE and WTMT. In addition to the over-the-air signal, The River is also heard on WOXL's second HD Radio channel, where it began.

History

Originally, 98.1 was a translator for WISE.  The River signed on October 1, 2008, with 10,000 songs in a row. Artists include Dave Matthews, Bob Marley, Van Morrison, Elvis Costello, Indigo Girls, R.E.M., U2, Norah Jones and Jack Johnson as well as less familiar performers such as Ray LaMontagne, Sara Bareilles, The John Butler Trio, My Morning Jacket, G. Love & Special Sauce and Ingrid Michaelson.

General manager Bob Bolak described the station as being designed for those who do not like radio. Listeners of The River, he said, want quality music, both old and new. Brad Savage of WCNR in Charlottesville, Virginia acted as consultant. The first songs played were "Take Me to the River" by the Talking Heads, "Radio Nowhere" by Bruce Springsteen and R.E.M.'s "It's The End Of The World As We Know It (And I Feel Fine)."

References

External links
official website
Saga Communications Radio Stations

251AO
Adult album alternative radio stations in the United States
Radio stations established in 2008